24 Comae Berenices is a triple star system in the northern constellation of Coma Berenices. It is visible to the naked eye, with the brightest component being an orange-hued star with an apparent visual magnitude of 5.03. The system is located at a distance of approximately 269 light-years from the Sun based on parallax, and is drifting further away with radial velocities of 3–5 km/s.

This system can be resolved in a telescope as a pair of stars with an angular separation of  along a position angle of 272°, as of 2018. If they are bound in an orbit, the estimated period is approximately 28,000 years.

The brighter member of this system is an aging giant or bright giant star with a stellar classification of K0II-III. It has exhausted the supply of hydrogen at its core and expanded to 20 times the girth of the Sun. This is a suspected variable that has been recorded ranging in brightness from magnitude 4.98 down to 5.06. The star is radiating 173 times the luminosity of the Sun from its swollen photosphere at an effective temperature of 4,688 K.

The fainter component at magnitude 6.57 is a double-lined spectroscopic binary with an orbital period of 7.33 days and an eccentricity of 0.26. The primary member of this pair is an A-type main-sequence star with a stellar classification of A9V. It is a metallic-lined Am star with 2.2 times the radius of the Sun. The stars radiate about 16 and 7 times the Sun's luminosity from its photosphere, respectively, at effective temperatures of 7,630 and 7180 K, respectively. Both have relatively low projected rotational velocity of around 14 km/s, and it is suspected the rotations of this binary system may be synchronized. The system is a source for X-ray emission, which is most likely coming from the secondary.

References

K-type bright giants
K-type giants
Suspected variables
A-type main-sequence stars
Am stars
Spectroscopic binaries
Triple stars

Coma Berenices
Durchmusterung objects
Coma Berenices, 24
109510/1
61415/61418
4791/2